Kay Brown (full name Mary Kay Brown, July 2, 1933 – January 2, 2022) was an American singer who recorded for Mercury and Decca in the 1950s.

She notably acted in the 1951 movie "The Strip" and sang the song "A Kiss to Build a Dream On" in it.

Personal life 
In the early 1950s she notably dated Mickey Rooney.

Brown was married to bandleader Maynard Ferguson for two years in the 1950s. In the early 1970s, she married Brent Lyon Wood.

References

External links 
 Discogs profile
 "Oop-Shoop" (song) on YouTube

1933 births
2022 deaths
American women singers
Traditional pop music singers
People from Peoria, Illinois